Treaty of Constantinople was a treaty between Ottoman Empire and Afsharid Persia signed on 24 September 1736, ending the Afsharid–Ottoman War (1730–35).

Background 
Treaty of Ahmet Pasha (1732) between the two countries had been found unsatisfactory in both countries. Ottoman Sultan Mahmut I didn't approve the abandonment of Tabriz and Nader, the future Shah of Iran dethroned Tahmasp II for accepting Ottoman control of the Caucasus.

War 
Shortly after the treaty of Ahmet Pasha, Nader declared war and attacked Iraq and Caucasus. In Iraq, after some initial victories such as capturing Kirkuk, he was repelled. But in Caucasus he was more successful. In less than two years Ottomans had to abandon both Tbilisi and Yerevan. Meanwhile Russian Empire was about to attack Ottoman Empire in Crimea and Ukraine (see Russo-Turkish War, 1735-1739). So the porte was compelled to sign a peace treaty.

Terms of the treaty 
Initial discussions between Ali Pasha (Ottoman side) and Mirza Muhammed (Persian side) in Iran about the territorial changes presented no big problem. But the competition between the two sects of Islam resulted heated discussions in the following sessions in Constantinople. Finally the terms were;

Ottoman Empire recognized Nader as the new shah of Persia.
Ottoman Empire conceded Caucasus to Persia
The Ottomans also agreed to allow the Iranian hajis (pilgrims) to Mecca (then under Ottoman control)

Aftermath 
By the treaty of Ahmet Pasha Persia had gained West Iran and by the treaty of Constantinople Persia had further gained Caucasus. But Nader had other plans. He was also planning to annex Iraq and possibly Eastern Anatolia. That's why  he renewed war in 1743. But this time, he was not successful. (see Treaty of Kerden)

References and notes

Constantinople 1736
Constantinople
Constantinople 1736
1736 in law
18th century in Istanbul
1736 in the Ottoman Empire
Ottoman–Persian War (1730–1735)